Ixodes hexagonus, also known by the common name hedgehog tick, is a tick species in the genus Ixodes. It is a parasite of the European hedgehog.

Appearance
Characteristically the female adult hedgehog tick have a heart shaped scutum. The scutum of males covers the entire idiosoma. Another characteristic feature the humped tarsus on the first leg pair. In colouration they are a dark brown. There is a distinct lateral groove, festoons are sometimes apparent. 

It occurs throughout the United Kingdom, sparsely in the North West, increasing in density to the South East. Although it does not usually occur on rodents or birds, and is "described as a nest-dwelling hedgehog specialist. It is also found on foxes, mustelids (including badgers), dogs and cats."

Distribution
Ixodes hexagonus is found throughout western Europe as far east as Siberia. It is widespread over this area. It is closely associated with its principal host the hedgehog.

Habitat
Ixodes hexagonus is endophillic; it is predominantly a nest based parasite. It spends most of its life in the nest of the main hedgehog host. Thus it is buffered from the environmental conditions experienced by many other free ranging ticks such as I. ricinus.

Role in Lyme disease
The hedgehog tick is a potentially important reservoir for Borrelia bacteria, the causative agent of Lyme disease. Studies indicate that both hedgehogs and I. hexagonus harbour Borrelia. I. hexagonus may act as an important vector of Lyme disease, transmitting it from hedgehog hosts to other small mammals. Thus ultimately it may spread to large mammals and humans. I. hexagonus may be important in sustaining Lyme disease in urban location where hedgehogs are a frequently found small mammal.

References

hexagonus
Arachnids of Africa
Arachnids of Europe
Animals described in 1815
Taxa named by William Elford Leach
Lyme disease
Hedgehog diseases